Thiruvidaimarudur Sambamurti Ganapaadigal Balakrishna Sastrigal (1919–2003) was a Great Hindu scholar and harikatha exponent.

Early life 
TS Balakrishna Sastrigal was born in 1919 in the town of Madras now known as Chennai in Tamil Nadu to Sambamurti Ganapaadigal. Sambamurti Ganapaadigal was a Vedic scholar who gave discourses.

Sastrigal had his schooling in Madras and graduated from the Madras Christian College. During his days in college, Balakrishna Sastrigal was proficient in English literature and acted in a few Shakespeare plays. He was fluent in several languages.

On completion of his studies, Sastrigal joined the Imperial bank of India (now State Bank of India).

His contribution is unimaginable and a source of great inspiration to many across the world. People would come and gather in thousands to listen to him. Such was his popularity. His recordings are much sort after to many across the globe.

Family 
Sastrigal's eldest son is Tamil actor, playwright and film director, T. S. B. K. Moulee. Another son, S. B. Khanthan is also a director in movies and in small screen.

Awards
 Sangeetha Kalasikhamani, 1988 by The Indian Fine Arts Society, Chennai.

References 
 Profiles of Artistes, Composers, Musicologists at saigan.com
 
 Harikatha artiste Balakrishna Sastrigal passes away at kutcheribuzz.com

1919 births
2003 deaths
Madras Christian College alumni
People from Thanjavur district
State Bank of India
Harikatha exponents